Stadionul Motorul may refer to two Romanian stadiums.

 Stadionul Motorul (Arad) 
 Stadionul Motorul (Oradea)